"Shine On" is a song by Australian rock band Jet, and is the seventh track on their second album Shine On. The single was released as the third single from that album in and Australia on 7 November 2006. A digital EP was released to the American iTunes Store in December 2006. It was subsequently released as a CD and 7" vinyl single in the UK on 5 March 2007.

The song was written by Nic to comfort his family after his father's death. He is quoted as saying: "It was inevitable I would write a song that dealt with all of that, but it was almost too big a subject for me to handle. Then I got a phone call from my mum saying everyone was depressed so I wrote the song through Dad's eyes, what he would say to help everyone through. We recorded it in one take, but it was emotional, very heavy. We couldn't be happier with this album."

The title of the song is in homage to "Shine On You Crazy Diamond", a similarly themed song by Pink Floyd. Similarly, the refrain of "Shine on, for everyone" is reminiscent of "Instant Karma!", a song by John Lennon.

The song was featured in the final episode of the television series The O.C. and also in a season final episode of Cold Case. The song was also in a first season episode of Brothers & Sisters.

The song missed the top 50 in Australia, reaching number 54 on the singles chart; similarly, in the UK it reached number 114. The song failed to chart in the United States but did peak at number 30 on the Modern Rock chart. The band performed the song at the Sydney Sound Relief concert in 2009.

This song features in the tribute to Fred Hollows and Fred Hollows Foundation advertisement on Australian television.

Track listings

Australian versions
CD/iTunes
"Shine On" (radio edit) - 3:43
"Coming Home Soon" - 4:23
"The Only Place That's Up from Here Is Down" (demo) - 3:09
"Eleanor" (full band version) - 3:33
"Shine On" (album version) - 4:36

British versions
Promo CD
"Shine On" - 3:43

7" 
"Shine On" - 3:43
"Eleanor" (full band version) - 3:33

CD 
"Shine On" - 3:43
"Coming Home Soon" - 4:23

American versions
Promo CD
"Shine On" (radio edit) – 3:43
"Shine On" (album version) – 4:38

iTunes EP
"Shine On" - 4:36
"Where Are All My Good Friends" - 3:37
"Jane Jones" - 2:53

Release details

References

External links
[ Discography - Jet - Shine On (Single)], Billboard

2007 singles
Jet (band) songs
2006 songs
Songs written by Nic Cester
Song recordings produced by Dave Sardy
Atlantic Records singles
Capitol Records singles